The 15th Santosham Film Awards is an awards ceremony held at Hyderabad, India on 12 August 2017 recognized the best films and performances from the Tollywood films and music released in 2016, along with special honors for lifetime contributions and a few special awards. The awards are annually presented by Santosham magazine.

Honorary Awards 

 Santosham Lifetime Achievement Award – Roja Ramani
 Santosham Dasari Smarakam Award (Producer) – Allu Aravind
 Santosham Dasari Smarakam Award (Actor) – Murali Mohan
 Santosham Dasari Smarakam Award (Writer) – Paruchuri brothers
 Santosham Dasari Smarakam Award (Film Journalism) – Pasupuleti Ramaravu
 Santosham Allu Ramalingaiah Smarakam Award – Saptagiri

Main Awards

Film

Music

Special Awards 

 Critic's Choice Best Debut Director – Bellamkonda Ramakrishna Reddy for Drushyam (2016)
 Special Jury Award for Best Actress – Mannara Chopra for Thikka (2016)
Best Film Journalist – Bhaagyalakshmi (Andhra Jyothi)
Best Video Journalist – Karunakar (Gemini TV)

Presenters

Performers 

 Anasuya Bharadwaj
Mannara Chopra
Richa Panai

References 

2017 Indian film awards
Santosham Film Awards
2017 film awards
2017 awards